Francesco Cupani ( 21 January 1657,  Mirto – 19 January 1710, Palermo ) 
was an Italian naturalist mainly interested in botany.

In 1692 he became the first Director of the botanic garden at Misilmeri. Here the plants were classified a system taxonomy of binomial nomenclature later made standard by Carl Linnaeus. This work put him in contact with many botanists, for instance Joseph Pitton de Tournefort, Caspar Commelin, William Sherard, James Petiver, Johann Georg Volckamer, Felice Viali (1638–1722) and Giovanni Battista Triumfetti. He is credited with cultivating wild sweetpeas and introducing them to the world. A sweetpea variety is named for him.

Works
 Catalogus plantarum sicularum Noviter adinventarum Palermo, 1692.
 Syllabus plantarum Siciliae Nuper detectarum Palermo, 1694.
 Hortus Catholicus Napoli, 1696.
 Pamphyton siculum, a natural history (fauna as well as flora) of Sicily published posthumously in 1713 and the result of 25 years work.

References

External links
 Herbarium (Cupani Hortus Siccus) 
 Alberto Massi 

1657 births
1710 deaths
People from the Province of Messina
17th-century Italian botanists
Italian naturalists
Scientists from Sicily
18th-century Italian botanists